This is the discography of British punk rock band Generation X.

Albums

Studio albums

Live albums

Compilation albums

EPs

Singles

See also
Billy Idol discography

Notes

References

Discographies of British artists
Punk rock discographies
Rock music group discographies